Parndecha Ngernprasert, formerly Suban Ngernprasert simply known as Bas, is a Thai professional footballer who plays as a midfielder for Thai League 1 club  Khon Kaen United.

Honours

Clubs
Bangkok Glass
 Thai FA Cup (1): 2014

References

External links
 Profile at Goal
http://th.soccerway.com/players/suban-ngernprasert/291181/

1994 births
Living people
Parndecha Ngernprasert
Parndecha Ngernprasert
Association football midfielders
Parndecha Ngernprasert
Parndecha Ngernprasert
Parndecha Ngernprasert